Praha-Smíchov railway station is a major railway station in Prague, Czech Republic, located in Smíchov, in the south-west of the city. It serves as a major railway station on the Czech national rail network, and is connected to the rest of Prague by its metro station of the same name and numerous tram routes which stop on Nádražní street outside the station. It is also a major bus terminus for lines going to the south and southwest of Prague and beyond. In 2009 the station served almost 4 million people.

The station was opened in 1862 as the terminus of the line linking Prague to Plzeň, operated by Česká Západní Dráha (Czech Western Railway). In 1872 and 1873, two more lines were built to the station, one from Hostivice and the other from Rudná. The present station building was built between 1953 and 1956 and designed by architects Jan Zázvorka and Ladislav Žák.

All trains going from Prague towards Plzeň and Písek pass through Smíchov as the first stop after the more central hub, Praha hlavní nádraží. It is also used as a terminus for inter-regional trains serving cities in the east of the Czech Republic, which pass first through hlavní nádraží and terminate at Smíchov. The station has a separate area named Praha-Smíchov severní nástupiště (Praha-Smichov northern platforms) which is technically a separate station, though it is often shown on abridged timetables as "Praha-Smíchov". These platforms serve the Prague Semmering line to Hostivice, now integrated into Esko Prague system as line S65. The main station is further served by lines S6 and S7 of the Esko system.

References

External links 

 Nádraží Praha-Smíchov (Pražská informační služba) (Czech)

Smichov
Railway stations opened in 1862
19th-century establishments in Bohemia
Smíchov
Railway stations in the Czech Republic opened in the 19th century